The arrow symbol ↓ may refer to:
 The downward direction, a relative direction
 The keyboard cursor control key, an arrow key
 A downwards arrow, a Unicode arrow symbol
 Logical NOR, operator which produces a result that is the negation of logical OR
 An undefined object, in mathematical well-definition
 A comma category, in category theory
 Down (game theory), a mathematical game
 The ingressive sound, in phonetics
 An APL function
 "Decreased" (and similar meanings), in medical notation
 The precipitation of an insoluble solid, in chemical notation

See also
Down sign (disambiguation)
 Arrow (disambiguation)
 ↑ (disambiguation)
 → (disambiguation)
 ← (disambiguation)

Logic symbols